In Greek and Roman mythology, Oeax or Oiax (Ancient Greek: Οἴακα or Οἴαξ means "handle of rudder, tiller") was a Euboean prince as the son of King Nauplius.

Family 
Oeax's mother has been variously named as Clymene, Hesione or Philyra. He was also the brother of Nausimedon and Palamedes, a Greek warrior at the Trojan War.

Mythology 
Because Oeax was angry at the Greeks for killing Palamedes at Troy, he falsely told Clytemnestra about Agamemnon bringing back Cassandra, a Trojan concubine, which led to Clytemnestra plotting to kill Agamemnon. Later, Oeax tried to banish Orestes after the latter murdered his mother Clytemnestra. Ultimately, Oeax and his brother Nausimedon were killed by Pylades after helping Aegisthus in his fight with Orestes.

Notes 

Princes in Greek mythology
Characters in Roman mythology

References 
 Apollodorus, The Library with an English translation by Sir James George Frazer, F.B.A., F.R.S. in 2 volumes, Cambridge, MA, Harvard University Press; London, William Heinemann Ltd. 1921. ISBN 0-674-99135-4. Online version at the Perseus Digital Library. Greek text available from the same website.
Dictys Cretensis, from The Trojan War. The Chronicles of Dictys of Crete and Dares the Phrygian translated by Richard McIlwaine Frazer, Jr. (1931-). Indiana University Press. 1966. Online version at the Topos Text Project.
 Euripides, The Complete Greek Drama, edited by Whitney J. Oates and Eugene O'Neill, Jr. in two volumes. 2. Orestes, translated by Robert Potter. New York. Random House. 1938. Online version at the Perseus Digital Library.
 Euripides, Euripidis Fabulae. vol. 3. Gilbert Murray. Oxford. Clarendon Press, Oxford. 1913. Greek text available at the Perseus Digital Library.
 Gaius Julius Hyginus, Fabulae from The Myths of Hyginus translated and edited by Mary Grant. University of Kansas Publications in Humanistic Studies. Online version at the Topos Text Project.
 Hard, Robin, The Routledge Handbook of Greek Mythology: Based on H.J. Rose's "Handbook of Greek Mythology", Psychology Press, 2004, . Google Books
Pausanias, Description of Greece with an English translation by W.H.S. Jones, Litt.D., and H.A. Ormerod, M.A., in 4 volumes. Cambridge, MA, Harvard University Press; London, William Heinemann Ltd. 1918. . Online version at the Perseus Digital Library
Pausanias, Graeciae Descriptio. 3 volumes. Leipzig, Teubner. 1903. Greek text available at the Perseus Digital Library
Tripp, Edward, Crowell's Handbook of Classical Mythology, Thomas Y. Crowell Co; first edition (June 1970).